Giovanni Battista Braschi or Giambattista Braschi (1657–1736) was a Roman Catholic prelate who served as Titular Archbishop of Nisibis (1724–1736) and Bishop of Sarsina (1699–1724).

Biography
Giovanni Battista Braschi was born in Cesene, Italy in 1657.
On 1 June 1699, he was appointed during the papacy of Pope Innocent XII as Bishop of Sarsina.
On 22 June 1699, he was consecrated bishop by Pier Matteo Petrucci, Cardinal-Priest of San Marcello, with Domenico Belisario de Bellis, Bishop of Molfetta, and Stefano Cupilli, Bishop of Trogir, serving as co-consecrators.
On 14 May 1718, he resigned as Bishop of Sarsina.
On 20 December 1724, he was appointed during the papacy of Pope Benedict XIII as Titular Archbishop of Nisibis.
He served as Titular Archbishop of Nisibis until his death on 24 November 1736 .

Episcopal succession

References

External links
"Diocese of Sarsina" Catholic-Hierarchy.org. David M. Cheney. Retrieved October 7, 2016
"Diocese of Sarsina" GCatholic.org. Gabriel Chow. Retrieved October 7, 2016
"Nisibis (Titular See)" Catholic-Hierarchy.org. David M. Cheney. Retrieved October 7, 2016
"Titular Archiepiscopal See of Nisibis (Turkey)" GCatholic.org. Gabriel Chow. Retrieved October 7, 2016

17th-century Italian Roman Catholic bishops
18th-century Italian Roman Catholic bishops
18th-century Italian Roman Catholic titular archbishops
Bishops appointed by Pope Innocent XII
Bishops appointed by Pope Benedict XIII
1657 births
1736 deaths